St Mary's Church is the Anglican parish church in Bletchley, a constituent town of Milton Keynes in Buckinghamshire, England. St Mary's is located on Church Green Road, Bletchley.

History 
The church dates from Norman times and the arch of the south doorway is Norman. The chancel is 13th century and there were additions in the 14th and 15th centuries.

More recently, the Church has moved away from a traditional choir and organ and now have a band.

Services
Since St John's joined St Mary's, all services are now at St Mary's. The latest schedule of services is available from the church website.

Members of staff
The following are members of staff at the church:

 Rev David McDougall - Rector
 Rev Rachel Ciampoli — Curate
 Rev Simon Faulks - Assistant Minister
 Mary Nicholls — Church Warden
 Oliver Hermes — Church Warden
 Maryann Brooks - Community Pastor
 Shana Kruesch - Worship & Media Pastor
 Nichola Whitmore - Office & Finance Manager
 Jac Butcher - Church Administrator
 Steve Adams - Caretaker

Youth Group
 Creche facilities - 0–2 years
 Footsteps — 3–5 years
 Striders — 5–11 years
 Dream Factory - 5–11 years
 Youth Friday - Years 11-14
 The Loft — Years 14-17

Music
Music at St Mary's consists of four main groups and a youth band.

References

External links
 Church website

Bletchley
Churches in Milton Keynes